Donald Benjamin Lindsley (December 23, 1907 – June 19, 2003) was a physiological psychologist most known as a pioneer in the field of brain function study. Considered by his colleagues to have been worthy of winning the Nobel Prize in Physiology for discovering the reticular activating system along with Horace Winchell (Tid) Magoun  and Giuseppe Moruzzi, Lindsley was instrumental in demonstrating the use of electroencephalography (EEG) in the study of brain function.

Early life and education
On December 23, 1907, Lindsley was born in Brownhelm Township, Lorain County, Ohio. It was at the time primarily a farming community. He was the youngest of four sons, one of which did not live past infancy. His father, Benjamin worked for the Cleveland Stone Company as a parts manager. Through his high school years Lindsley excelled as an athlete, winning medals and titles in track, baseball, and basketball. He lived a simple, small town country life, spending his summers fishing and hunting in the cold seasons. He played the trumpet which served to pay his passage on a cruise ship to Europe. He did not have aspirations of going to college since no one in his family had done so before nor could his family afford it. However through the encouragement of one of his teachers, he pursued a higher education deciding he would work his way through college. His commitment to the field of psychology began at Wittenberg College in 1925.

Lindsley attended Wittenberg College (now University) in 1925-1929 and received his PhD in psychology from the University of Iowa under a scholarship. It was at the University of Iowa that he met his wife, Ellen Ford. She was a theater arts major and the daughter of Arthur Ford - a professor of electrical engineering at the University of Iowa. They later married in 1933 and were married for sixty-two years. It was at the University of Iowa that Lindsley mastered the use of lab equipment and physiology, publishing six papers on human and rat muscle activity.

Activation theory and Ascending reticular system
In 1945, Lindsley undertook basic neurophysiological research with Horace Winchell Mangoun at the Northwestern Medical School in downtown Chicago. 
The 19th century prevailing theory of sleep and waking stated that brain organization and behavior was based on a sensory-motor schema. The waking state was thought to be supported by sensory input while sleep was conceived as the product of sensory withdrawal. This theory was reasonable and unchallenged at the time as there was no knowledge of another major type of system in the brain beyond sensory and motor systems.

In 1949, Mangoun and visiting scientist, Giuseppe Moruzzi from the University of Pisa, challenged this theory when they accidentally discovered a new type of brain system while experimenting with spinal reflexes on an anesthetized cat. This brain system's existence had not yet been suspected. This research was argued by proponents until Lindsley led a team to perform the experiments that established the validity to this new system, the ascending reticular activating system and came up with Activation theory. It postulated that there is an arousal continuum on which significantly lower emotion  at one extreme and intense emotion at the other can be located through EEG from the reticular substance and thus concluded an organism is in a continuous state of emotional flux related to the state and environment they habituate.

Awards

 Scholarship to University of Iowa
 National Research Council Fellowship 1933–1935 at Harvard Medical School
 First EEG publication 1936
 First in utero recordings of the EEG and EKG, as early as the fifth month, 1938
 Election to the Society for Experimental Psychologists, 1942
 Presidential Certificate of Merit for WWII effort, 1948
 National Academy of Sciences, 1952
 Distinguished Scientific Contribution Award, A.P.A., 1959
 Professorship at Northwestern University
 Sleep waking theory published in 1949- validity of Ascending Reticular Activating System
 Co-founded Brain Research Institute at UCLA, 1961
 Election to the American Academy of Arts and Sciences, 1965
 Ralph Gerard Prize for distinguished contributions to Neuroscience, Society for Neuroscience, 1988
 Obituary of Lee Edward Travis, 1989
 Handbook of Experimental Psychology, Chapter on Emotion, 1951
 Honorary degrees from Brown University, Trinity College, Loyola University, Johannes Gutenberg University
 50 students received their doctorates under Lindsley and 70 post-doctorates

Contributions
Lindsley was one of the first in his field to utilize electroencephalography (EEG) to record brain activity. He developed a means for measuring human sensory processing and rapid electrical changes in the brain. He contributed to understanding wakefulness and arousal in relation to brainstem activating systems. He developed an interdisciplinary approach to researching the psychological variables associated with the reticular activating system He even developed a film, Psychologists Here, There, and Everywhere, a moving-picture record of hundreds of scientists in action at the annual professional meetings of the American Psychological Association from 1946 to 1957.

References

1907 births
2003 deaths
University of California, Los Angeles faculty
20th-century American psychologists
Wittenberg University alumni
University of Iowa alumni